Cratera ochra is a species of land planarian in the subfamily Geoplaninae. It is found in Brazil

Description 
The color of the dorsum is yellow-ochre covered with a dispersed greyish to greyish-brown pigmentation forming two diffuse and irregular longitudinal bands and two paramarginal longitudinal stripes slightly darker than the bands. The ventral side is pale-yellow.

The several eyes of C. ochra are distributed marginally in the first millimeters of the body and posteriorly become dorsal, occupying around 40% of the body width on each side at the median third of the body.

Etymology 
The specific epithet ochra refers to the yellow-ochre color of the animal's dorsum.

Distribution 
The habitat of C. ochra includes moist forests in northeast Rio Grande do Sul, southern Brazil, as well as plantations of Araucaria angustifolia and Pinus spp.

References 

Geoplanidae
Invertebrates of Brazil